Luiz Rhodolfo Dini Gaioto (born 11 August 1986), or simply Rhodolfo, is a Brazilian professional footballer who plays as a centre back..

Career
Made professional debut away to Internacional in 0–2 defeat on 10 September 2006 in the Campeonato Brasileiro.

In 2014, Rhodolfo became the vice-captain of Grêmio, taking the position previously occupied by Zé Roberto. In August 2014, Rhodolfo moved definitively to Grêmio, who paid €4,000,000 to São Paulo. His contract with the Gaucho team ran through December 2017.

Beşiktaş J.K.
On 24 July 2015 he signed with Turkish club Beşiktaş J.K. for three years with a conditional fourth year.

Flamengo
On 11 June 2017, he was announced as new player by Flamengo, with a contract lasting until December 2019. Flamengo paid €1,1m to Beşiktaş J.K. to sign the player.

Career statistics

Honours

Club
Atlético Paranaense
Campeonato Paranaense: 2009

São Paulo
Copa Sudamericana: 2012

Beşiktaş
Süper Lig: 2015–16, 2016–17

Flamengo
Copa Libertadores: 2019
Campeonato Brasileiro Série A: 2019
Campeonato Carioca: 2019

International
Brazil
Superclásico de las Américas: 2011

Individual
Campeonato Paulista Team of the year: 2011

References

External links
 Rhodolfo profile. Sambafoot.
 Rhodolfo profile. Furacão.com.
 Rhodolfo profile. Zero Zero.

1986 births
Living people
Brazilian footballers
Brazilian expatriate footballers
Club Athletico Paranaense players
São Paulo FC players
Grêmio Foot-Ball Porto Alegrense players
Beşiktaş J.K. footballers
CR Flamengo footballers
Coritiba Foot Ball Club players
Cruzeiro Esporte Clube players
Campeonato Brasileiro Série A players
Campeonato Brasileiro Série B players
Süper Lig players
Expatriate footballers in Turkey
People from Bandeirantes
Association football defenders
Sportspeople from Paraná (state)